The 1993–94 Iran 2nd Division football season was played in one groups of ten teams each. The top four teams gained promotion to the Azadegan League.

Standings

References 
 www.rsssf.com

League 2 (Iran) seasons
Iran
2